SSNDOB was an online marketplace that sold stolen Social Security numbers, birth dates and other personal information of U.S. citizens starting in 2012 until it was shut down in June 2022 following a U.S. government seizure. It used the domain names ssndob.ws, ssndob.vip, ssndob.club, and blackjob.biz.

Operations 
In 2013 Brian Krebs reported that SSNDOB, at the time using the domain ssndob.ru, was selling consumers' credit reports , drivers licenses for $4 and background reports for $12. A "full" record included the person's full name, address, phone number, date of birth and Social Security number cost 50 cents. Fulls could also be searched by date of birth for $1 and ZIP code for $1.50. He also reported that the site initially obtained its information by hacking LexisNexis, Short Hills, Dun & Bradstreet, and Kroll Background America. Krebs learned this after SSNDOB itself was hacked. As a result of his reporting, Krebs's website faced a DDoS attack and his house was swatted.

Since April 2015, SSNDOB accepted payment in Bitcoin, receiving nearly $22million until it was shutdown.

At the time it was shut down, the site had information on about 24 million U.S. citizens.

Shutdown 
On June 7, 2022, police in Cyprus seized SSNDOB's servers, which were operated by a Cyprus resident who was cooperating with authorities. At the same time, the U.S. Department of Justice announced they had seized SSNDOB's domains.

References 

Internet properties established in 2012
Internet properties disestablished in 2022
Internet services shut down by a legal challenge
Defunct websites
Domain name seizures by United States